Faith is the third studio album by English rock band The Cure, released on 17 April 1981 by Fiction Records. The album saw the band continuing in the gloomy vein of their previous album Seventeen Seconds (1980), which would conclude with their next album Pornography (1982).

Preceded by the single "Primary", the album was well-received by critics and was a commercial success in the UK, peaking at number fourteen on the UK Albums Chart and staying on the chart for eight weeks.

Background 
Following the tour for Seventeen Seconds, The Cure returned to Morgan Studios on 27 September 1980 to record a new album, minus Matthieu Hartley, who had departed due to disagreement with the musical direction of the band. During this session, recordings of songs "All Cats Are Grey" and "Primary" were attempted, but neither ended up on the album. Robert Smith was hoping the tracks would sound "funereal", but instead he said "they just sounded dull". Several other studios were tried: Red Bus, Trident, The Roundhouse and Abbey Road.

Much of Faith was written in the studio. At least two songs on the album, "All Cats Are Grey" and "The Drowning Man", were inspired by the Gormenghast novels of Mervyn Peake. Faith was the first album by the Cure to feature a six-string bass guitar; "All Cats Are Grey" features Smith on keyboards and piano, with no guitar at all.

The instrumental piece "Carnage Visors" (i.e., rose-coloured spectacles; originally available only on the long-play cassette release) is the soundtrack to Carnage Visors, a short film by Ric Gallup, Simon Gallup's brother, that was screened at the beginning of shows in place of a support band on the 1981 Picture Tour, and featured animation of several dolls in different positions and stances. The film has since disappeared, and only Smith, Lol Tolhurst and Simon Gallup own copies of it, though during a televised interview in the mid-1980s, the host of the program surprised the band by playing a clip of the film on set.

The album's cover, designed by former and future member Porl Thompson, is a veiled picture of the church Bolton Priory, in the fog.

Release and reissue
Faith was released on 17 April 1981. It reached No. 14 in the UK Albums Chart. The album was remastered in 2005 as part of Universal Music's Deluxe Edition series. The new edition featured "Carnage Visors", demos and live tracks as well as the non-album single "Charlotte Sometimes". It also included a few never-before-released tracks (in demo form, all instrumentals).

Critical reception and legacy 

Faith divided critics upon release. Sounds reviewer John Gill wrote that while the more uptempo songs "Primary" and "Doubt" were reminiscent of the Cure's previous work, with a "sense of strong, haunting melody", the remainder of the album marked a stark departure for the band; he noted a "Neu!-ish sense of smudged melody, soft tones flowing around a languorous, groaning bass", and found that the band's new sound evoked 1960s acts such as Pink Floyd and the Doors. Gill remarked that "listening to Faith requires a personal act of involvement, the reward being a sense of belonging." Melody Maker deemed the record "impressive", praising its "richness and deceptive power". Writer Adam Sweeting described Faith as "a sophisticated exercise in atmosphere and production", adding, "It's gloomy but frequently majestic, never using brute force where auto-suggestion will do. You may not love it, but you'll become addicted to it." David Hepworth of Smash Hits said that "despite some rather stilted lyrics", the Cure "continue to develop one of the most individual and pleasing styles around." NMEs review of the album, written by Ray Lowry, was accompanied by a picture of the band and a caption reading: "Gloomy? Gothic? Us?". Lowry wrote that the album "says absolutely nothing meaningful" and dismissed it as "just the modern face of Pink Floydism." Record Mirrors Mike Nicholls found that "The Cure remain stuck in the hackneyed doom-mongering that should have died with Joy Division" and panned Faith as "hollow, shallow, pretentious, meaningless, self-important and bereft of any real heart or soul".

In a retrospective review, Chris True of AllMusic called Faith "a depressing record, certainly, but also one of the most underrated and beautiful albums the Cure put together." In 2010, Fact ranked the album as one of the 20 best "goth records ever made".

Track listing

Personnel 
The Cure

 Robert Smith – vocals, guitars, keyboards, six-string bass, production
 Simon Gallup – bass guitar, production
 Lol Tolhurst – drums, production

Production

 Mike Hedges – production, engineering
 Graham Carmichael – engineering
 David Kemp – engineering
 Martyn Webster – engineering assistance
 Porl Thompson – album cover design

Charts 
Album

Weekly charts

Year-end charts

Singles – Billboard (United States)

Certifications

References

External links 

 

The Cure albums
1981 albums
Albums produced by Mike Hedges
Fiction Records albums
A&M Records albums
Elektra Records albums
Rhino Records albums
Albums recorded at Morgan Sound Studios